Báez is a Cuban village and consejo popular ("people's council", i.e. hamlet) of the municipality of Placetas, in Villa Clara Province. In 2011 it had a population of around 7,000.

History
The village was founded in 1804 with the name Hato de La Manigua, and some years later was named after a Spanish general named Guillermo Báez. Until the 1977 administrative reform, it was part of the municipality of Santa Clara.

Geography
Báez is located on a valley between the Escambray Mountains and the borders with Sancti Spíritus Province, below a hillock and east of Agabama Reservoir. Nearest village is Guaracabulla, located 5 km north, and Agabama, 11 km south.

It is 16 km from Fomento, 19 from Placetas, 26 from Mataguá, 36 from Manicaragua and 40 from Santa Clara and Cabaiguán, 62 from Sancti Spíritus and 67 from Hanabanilla.

Transport
The village is served by the A1 motorway at the exit "Báez-Guaracabulla". It counts a railway station on the line Placetas-Trinidad-Casilda.

Personalities
Pepin Garcia (b. 1950), Cuban-American businessman

See also
Municipalities of Cuba
List of cities in Cuba

References

External links

Populated places in Villa Clara Province
Placetas
Populated places established in 1804
1804 establishments in North America
Villa Clara Province
1804 establishments in the Spanish Empire